Nicholas Clayton (11 March 1826 – 23 April 1867) was an Australian cricketer. He played one first-class match for Tasmania in 1858.

See also
 List of Tasmanian representative cricketers

References

External links
 

1826 births
1867 deaths
Australian cricketers
Tasmania cricketers
Cricketers from Tasmania